Listen to the Dawn is an album by guitarist Kenny Burrell recorded in late 1980 and released on the Muse label in 1983.

Reception 

The Allmusic review called it a "Sharp trio set" and stated: "The results are uniformly solid, sometimes more emphatic than others. Burrell is still playing in a relaxed, easy groove, but occasionally increases the energy level".

Track listing 
All compositions by Kenny Burrell except where noted.
 "Yours Is My Heart Alone" (Franz Lehar, Harry B. Smith) – 3:30
 "My One and Only Love" (Guy Wood, Robert Mellin) – 6:14
 "You're My Everything" (Harry Warren, Mort Dixon, Joe Young) – 6:27
 "Listen to the Dawn" – 5:37
 "Isabella" – 5:31
 "It Amazes Me" (Cy Coleman, Carolyn Leigh) – 5:05
 "Never Let Me Go" (Jay Livingston, Ray Evans) – 5:56
 "Papa Joe" – 5:21

Personnel 
Kenny Burrell – guitar
Rufus Reid – bass
Ben Riley – drums

References 

Kenny Burrell albums
1983 albums
Muse Records albums